Dennebrœucq is a commune in the Pas-de-Calais department in the Hauts-de-France region of France. The medieval Flemish placename used to be Denebroek

Geography
The village spreads along the D159 road, 12 miles (19 km) south of Saint-Omer.

History
Dennebrœucq is home to the adventure playground Dennlys Parc, created in 1983 on the site of the old watermill.

Population

Places of interest
 The church of St.Leger, dating from the sixteenth century.
 The nineteenth century chapel.

See also
Communes of the Pas-de-Calais department

References

External links

 Dennlys Parc 

Dennebroeucq